UPECA Aerotech Sdn. Bhd.  informally known as UPECA, is a part of Senior plc. It is the one of Malaysia's largest aerostructure suppliers to Spirit Aerosystems Europe and UTC Aerospace System. UPECA Aerotech's headquarters and manufacturing plant is in Shah Alam, Selangor. UEPECA Aerotech supply aircraft components on Airbus 320, Airbus 330, Airbus 350 and Boeing 787 platforms. A manufacturing plant will be opened near Subang Airport in order to serve UPECA’s manufacturing, storage and distribution of aerospace parts.

History
UPECA Technologies, the parent company, was incorporated in 1990. UPECA Aerotech was established in 2005 in order to support the Malaysian government's aspirations to develop the nation's aerospace manufacturing industry. Senior plc, a United Kingdom maker of parts for the aircraft and the vehicle industries, bought UPECA Technologies in order to expand its business in the growing Asian market.

References

External links
 

Aerospace companies of Malaysia
Aircraft engineering companies
Manufacturing companies established in 2005
Privately held companies of Malaysia
2005 establishments in Malaysia